Dr. Kwabena Adjei (19432019), sometimes referred to as Nkonya Terminator was a Member of Parliament for the Biakoye Constituency in the Oti region of Ghana. He was also the former chairman of the National Democratic Congress.

Early life and education 
Kwabena Adjei was born on 9 March 1943 at Nkonya Ntsumuru in the Oti region. He attended the University of Ghana, Legon and graduated with a Bachelor of Arts (Hons) Psychology in 1970. In 1973 and 1978, he had his Doctor of Philosophy (Research Methods & Statistics in Psychology) and Master of Business Administration from the University of Strathclyde and University of Ghana respectively.

Politics 
Kwabena was a key founding member of the National Democratic Congress. He represented Biakoye Constituency in the 1st, 2nd and 3rd Parliament of the 4th Republic of Ghana.

He was elected into the first parliament of the fourth republic of Ghana on 7 January 1993 after he was pronounced winner at the 1992 Ghanaian parliamentary election held on 29 December 1992.

He served as Minister for Lands & Forestry, Food & Agriculture and Parliamentary Affairs under presidency of J.J Rawlings. He was elected Chairman of the National Democratic Congress in 2005, he succeeded Obed Asamoah.

Career 
He was an Educationist. He taught psychology and sociology in University of Ghana, University of Cape Coast, University of Maiduguri.

Elections 
Adjei was first elected into Parliament during the 1996 Ghanaian General Elections, he polled 20,740 votes out of the 26,564 valid votes cast representing 63.90% over Abotsina Festus Andrews of the New Patriotic Party, Alexander Kwame Mensah of the Democratic People's Party, Christiana Amaa Pokuah Nyark of the Convention People's Party and George k. Afari of the people's National Convention who polled 1,903 votes, 1,897 votes, 1,706 votes and 348 votes respectively.

He was elected again as the Member of Parliament for the Biakoye constituency in the 2000 Ghanaian general elections. He won the elections. His constituency was a part of the 17 parliamentary seats out of 19 seats won by the National Democratic Congress in that election for the Volta Region.

The National Democratic Congress won a minority total of 92 parliamentary seats out of 200 seats in the 3rd parliament of the 4th republic of Ghana. He was elected with 15,036 votes out of 22,042 total valid votes cast.

This was equivalent to 69% of the total valid votes cast. He was elected over Edward C. Boateng of the New Patriotic Party, William K. Semanhyia of the National Reformed Party, Christian O. Nyarko of the Convention People's Party and Atsu N. Missiahyia of the United Ghana Movement. These obtained 4,108, 1,674, 751 and 210 votes respectively out of the total valid votes cast. These were equivalent to 18.9%, 7.7%, 3.4% and 1% respectively of total valid votes cast.

References

External links 
 LinkedIn Page

1943 births
2019 deaths
University of Ghana alumni
Ghanaian MPs 1993–1997
Ghanaian MPs 1997–2001
Ghanaian MPs 2001–2005
Ghanaian educators
University of Strathclyde
National Democratic Congress (Ghana) politicians
Government ministers of Ghana
People from Volta Region
21st-century Ghanaian politicians